The Army of the Cherbourg coasts was a French Revolutionary Army.

Combat Record
Formed by splitting the Army of the Coasts in April 1793, it was put under the command of Georges Félix de Wimpffen and charged with defending the coasts of Manche against British invasion, and fighting against federalist revolts in Normandy and Caen. However, Wimpffen switched sides, and allied to the Girondists and so was removed from his post. He was replaced by Charles Guillaume Sepher.  Following inactive combat, in 1794 it was merged with the Army of the Coasts of Brest, under Lazare Hoche then from May to November 1795 under Jean-Baptiste Annibal Aubert du Bayet.

Members
 Gabriel Marie Joseph d'Hédouville — général de brigade.

See also
 
 

Coasts of Cherbourg
History of Cherbourg-en-Cotentin
Military units and formations established in 1793
Military units and formations disestablished in 1794
1793 establishments in France
1794 disestablishments in France